Joukamojärvi is a medium-sized lake in the Koutajoki main catchment area. It is located in Kuusamo municipality, in the region Northern Ostrobothnia in Finland.

See also
List of lakes in Finland

References

Lakes of Kuusamo